Rani Hendricks (4 January 1953 – 24 March 2020) was a South African cricketer. He played in 28 first-class matches from 1972/73 to 1981/82. He was one of the leading all-rounders in South Africa's non-white cricket competitions in the 1970s and 1980.

References

1953 births
2020 deaths
South African cricketers
Eastern Province cricketers
Western Province cricketers
Cricketers from Port Elizabeth